Pettaquamscutt Rock (also known as Treaty Rock) is a rock formation (pillar) in the town of South Kingstown in the U.S. state of Rhode Island. The rock was the scene of 17th-century treaties between white settlers and the Narragansetts.

References

Rock formations of the United States
Landforms of Washington County, Rhode Island